Primero de Enero Municipal Museum is a museum located in Primero de Enero, Cuba. It was established on 28 September 1982.

The museum holds collections on history, natural science, numismatics and archeology.

See also 
 List of museums in Cuba

References 

Museums in Cuba
Buildings and structures in Ciego de Ávila Province
Museums established in 1982
1982 establishments in Cuba
20th-century architecture in Cuba